Bhojpur district is one of the thirty-eight districts of the Indian state of Bihar. Arrah town (also known as Ara) is the administrative headquarters of this district. Bhojpur district came into existence in 1972. Earlier it was the part of Shahabad district. This district is named "Bhojpur" after great Parmara King Bhoja as most early settlers were Rajput rulers of Parmara dynasty then called as Ujjainiya.

In the year 1972, Shahabad district was bifurcated in two parts namely Bhojpur and Rohtas. Buxar was a subdivision of old Bhojpur district then. In 1992, Buxar became a separate district and presently the rest of Bhojpur district has now three sub-divisions – Ara Sadar, Jagdishpur and Piro. It shares its border with Utthe  Pradesh in the noth west.

Geography

It is located (the headquarter Arrah) at a longitude of 83° 45' to 84° 45' East and the latitude is 25° 10' to 25° 40' North and is situated at a height of 193 meters above sea level.

Politics 

|}

Economy
In 2006 the Indian government named Bhojpur one of the country's 250 most backward districts (out of a total of 640). It is one of the 38 districts in Bihar currently receiving funds from the Backward Regions Grant Fund Programme (BRGF).

History

Till 1972, Bhojpur was part of old Shahabad District. The present district of Bhojpur came into existence in 1972, when Shahabad district was bifurcated in two parts namely Bhojpur and Rohtas. From 1972 to 1992, Buxar was a sub-division of Bhojpur district only. Later in 1992 Buxar district got separated from Bhojpur district. Bhojpur falls under Patna division.

Administration
The Bhojpur district is headed by an IAS officer of the rank of District Magistrate (DM). 

The district has got 1209 villages, 36 police stations and 1 municipality, Arrah, which has now become a Municipal Corporation.

Tehsils
Bhojpur district comprises three tehsils or Sub-divisions, each headed by a Sub-Divisional Magistrate (SDM):
Arrah Sadar
Jagdishpur
Piro

Blocks
These Tehsils are further divided into 14 Blocks, each headed by a Block Development Officer (BDO)
Arrah
Agiaon
Barhara
Bihiya
Charpokhari
Garhani
Jagdispur
Koilwar
Piro
Udwantnagar
Sahar
Sandesh
Shahpur
Tarari

Climate 
The climate of the district is of moderately extreme type. The summers are hot and the winter are cool. Most of the rain that the district receives is from the South- West monsoon, during July and August. Winters are quite dry and light showers may take place during the Rabi crop.

Demographics

According to the 2011 census Bhojpur district, Bihar has a population of 2,728,407, roughly equal to the nation of Kuwait or the US state of Nevada. This gives it a ranking of 145th in India (out of a total of 640). Its population growth rate over the decade 2001–2011 was 21.27%. Bhojpur has a sex ratio of 907 females for every 1000 males, and a literacy rate of 72.79%. 14.29% of the population lives in urban areas. Scheduled Castes and Scheduled Tribes make up 15.59% and 0.51% of the population respectively.

Languages

At the time of the 2011 Census of India, 92.06% of the population in the district spoke Bhojpuri, 5.23% Hindi and 2.50% Urdu as their first language. Bhojpuri is considered a Hindi dialect in the census, so in census data its speakers are categorized as speaking Hindi.

Languages include Bhojpuri, a language with almost 2,000,000 speakers, according to the study of 'Times of India Daily' written in both the Devanagari and Kaithi scripts, Hindi and Urdu.

Education
Colleges

 Veer Kunwar Singh University
 Harprasad Das Jain College
 Maharaja College, Arrah
 Jagjiwan College
 Maa Aranya Devi B.ed college - bhojpur

Notable people

Politics 

 Veer Kunwar Singh, leader of the Indian Rebellion of 1857 in Bihar.
 Hare Krishna Singh, commander-in-chief of Kunwar Singh's forces during the rebellion.
 Jagat Narain Lal, general secretary of Hindu Mahasbha.
 Sachchidananda Sinha, interim president of the Constituent Assembly of India, member of the Imperial Legislative Council and the Indian Legislative Assembly.
Babu Jagjivan Ram, Deputy Prime Minister of India, Defense Minister of India during 1971 India Pakistan war.
Meira Kumar, first woman speaker of the Lok Sabha. She was a Union Minister during UPA-I. She has also served as Indian ambassador to Spain and the UK.
Ram Subhag Singh, Union Minister for Food and Agriculture (1962-1964), Union Minister of Parliamentary Affairs (1967-1969), Union Minister of Communications and Information Technology (1967-1969), Union Minister of Railways (February 1969-4 November 1969). He was the leader of India's first Opposition in the Lok Sabha (1969-1970).
Bindeshwari Dubey, Chief Minister of Bihar. He was Union minister for Law and Justice in Rajiv Gandhi's cabinet
Anant Sharma, Governor of the State of Punjab and the West Bengal. Union Minister in Government of India, for Ministries of Communications, Surface Transport, Shipping and Civil Aviation during Indira Gandhi's time.
Amarendra Pratap Singh, Cabinet Minister of Agriculture in Government of Bihar.
Brahmeshwar Singh, head of Ranvir Sena.
Jagdish Mahto, founder of Naxal movement in Ekwari, member of CPI (ML).
Shivanand Tiwari, ex-Cabinet Minister in Government of Bihar and former Rajya Sabha MP on JDU ticket.
Abdul Qaiyum Ansari, freedom fighter, President of All India Momin conference through which he fought against Jinnah's two nation theory, cabinet minister of Bihar, member of parliament.

Government office holders 

 Bhuvaneshwar Prasad Sinha, 6th Chief Justice of India (1 October 1959 – 31 January 1964).
 B.P. Singh, Judge at the Supreme Court of India, Chief Justice of Bombay High Court, Grandson of Bhuvaneshwar Prasad Sinha.
 Krishna Ballabh Narayan Singh, Ex-Chief Justice of the Patna High Court from 1976 to 1982. (a native of Kulharia village near Koilwar)
 Anil Sinha, Director of the Central Bureau of Investigation (CBI) from 2014 to 2016.
 Shashi Bhushan Sahai (IPS), Director-General of Bihar Police.
 Muni Lall (IAS), Ex-Union Minister of India and Lok Sabha MP of Sasaram from 1996 to 2004.

Academia & literature 

 Vashishtha Narayan Singh, mathematician.
 Amitava Kumar, English writer, Helen D. Lockwood Chair Professor at Vassar College
 Acharya Shivpujan Sahay, Hindi novelist.
 Mithileshwar, Hindi writer.

Television & film personalities 

 S. H. Bihari, Bollywood lyricist.
 Shailendra (lyricist), Bollywood lyricist.
 Vinay Pathak, actor.
 Pawan Singh, singer and actor.
 Neeraj Pandey, filmmaker.
 Vishal Aditya Singh, actor.

Villages 
 

Dumraon Tola

References

External links
 Official website

 
Patna division
Districts of Bihar